Catapodium is a genus of Eurasian and North African plants in the grass family.

Species list 
The genus comprises the following species:
 Catapodium demnatense (Murb.) Maire & Weiller - Morocco
 Catapodium mamoraeum (Maire) Maire & Weiller - Morocco
 Catapodium marinum (L.) C.E.Hubb. - Eurasia + North Africa from Ireland + Canary Islands to Turkey
 Catapodium rigidum (L.) C.E.Hubb. - Eurasia + North Africa from Ireland + Canary Islands to Crimea + Iran + Arabian Peninsula

Taxa formerly included 
See Aeluropus Agropyropsis Castellia Catabrosa Cutandia Desmazeria  Eragrostiella Micropyrum Narduroides Tripogon Vulpia Wangenheimia:

See also
 List of Poaceae genera

References

External links
 Grassbase, World Online Grass Flora: Catapodium

 
Poaceae genera
Grasses of Africa
Grasses of Asia
Grasses of Oceania